Robert Genuario (born March 31, 1952) is a Connecticut Superior Court judge appointed by Governor M. Jodi Rell in 2005. He had served as Secretary of the State of Connecticut Office of Policy and Management since January 2005. He was a seven-term Republican member of the Connecticut Senate, representing Norwalk and part of Darien, Connecticut in Connecticut's 25th District from 1991 to 2001.

Early life and family 
Genuario received his B.A. from Villanova University in 1974, and earned his law degree from Villanova University's School of Law in 1977. He is a partner in the Norwalk law firm of Genuario & Conover. He served as a law clerk with the Connecticut Superior Court from 1977 to 1978. Genuario resides in Norwalk with his wife, MaryAnn and four sons, Robert Jr., Eric, Adam and Andrew.

Political career 
Prior to his election to the Connecticut Senate, Genuario served as a member of the Norwalk Board of Education from 1981 to 1990, and as its chairman in 1982, 1983, and 1990.

He was president of the Norwalk Jaycees and the former director of the Norwalk Lions Club.

Genuario served on the Boards of Trustees of the Norwalk YMCA, Norwalk Maritime Aquarium, Steppingstones Children’s Museum, the Child Guidance Center of Middle Fairfield County, and Honey Hill Nursing Home.

In 1990, Genuario was elected to the Connecticut Senate. He served as Deputy Minority Leader, and on the following committees:

 Ranking member on the Connecticut General Assembly’s Appropriations Committee
 Ranking member of the General Assembly's Education Committee and the Planning and Development Committee
 Member, Judiciary Committee
 Member, Energy and Technology Committee
 Member Legislative Management Committee
 Member, Governor's Alcohol and Drug Policy Council
 Member, Program Review Committee
 Member, Elementary and Secondary Education Committee
 Member, Program Review Committee
 Member, Elementary and Secondary Education Committee

In January 2005, Genuario was appointed by Governor M. Jodi Rell to run the state Office of Policy and Management.

In 2010, Genuario was appointed to the Connecticut Superior Court by Rell.

Associations 
 Board of Trustees, Child Guidance Center Mid-Fairfield, 2001–present
 Board of Trustees, Maritime Aquarium at Norwalk, 2001–present
 Board of Trustees, Stepping Stones Museum for Children, 2000–present
 Board of Trustees, Honey Hill Nursing Home, 1999–present
 Connecticut Bar Association
 President, Norwalk Jaycees
 Director, Norwalk Lions Club

Awards 
 Community Justice Coalition of Connecticut Honor Roll (1995)
 Children's Hero Award, Connecticut Children's Trust Fund
 Family Legislator of the Year, Connecticut Association of Family Service Agencies (1996)

References 

1952 births
American people of Italian descent
Connecticut lawyers
Connecticut state court judges
Republican Party Connecticut state senators
Living people
Politicians from Norwalk, Connecticut
Villanova University alumni
Villanova University School of Law alumni